"Mad Woman" (stylized in all lowercase) is a song by American singer-songwriter Taylor Swift, from her eighth studio album Folklore (2020), which was released on July 24, 2020, through Republic Records. The song was written by Swift and its producer, Aaron Dessner. "Mad Woman" is a ballad that confronts gaslighting and the sexist taboo regarding women's anger.

Inspired by Swift's masters controversy with American businessman Scooter Braun in 2019, "Mad Woman" incorporates satire and a witch hunt trope, depicting an old widow scorned by her town. Critics appreciated the song's restrained feminist message, which they contrasted to that of the humor in Swift's 2019 song "The Man" and the vengeful tone of "Look What You Made Me Do" (2017). "Mad Woman" reached the top 40 on the songs charts in Australia, Canada, Singapore, and number 10 on the U.S. Billboard Hot Rock & Alternative Songs chart.

Background and release
Taylor Swift surprise-released her eighth studio album, Folklore, on July 24, 2020, through Republic Records. The album eschews the upbeat pop production of Swift's previous three releases and adapts indie folk and alternative styles, brought about by collaborations with Aaron Dessner and Jack Antonoff. Dessner has sole production credits on ten tracks, including "Mad Woman". Like most tracks that Dessner produced for Folklore, "Mad Woman" was developed on "melodic and emotional" piano tunes. Swift described Dessner's piano and string sounds as "ominous", which prompted her to write and sing about "female rage"—a theme she thought would complement with the production. In the primer that preceded the album's release, Swift teased imageries of various tracks, with "Mad Woman" being about "a misfit widow getting gleeful revenge on the town that cast her out."

In an interview with Entertainment Weekly in December 2020, Swift implied that the song was inspired by the events that followed the masters controversy, in which she became embroiled in a publicized dispute with American businessman Scooter Braun, who purchased the masters of her back catalog after she signed a new recording contract. Though Swift never explicitly name-checked Braun, in the documentary Folklore: The Long Pond Studio Sessions, she spoke to Dessner about "Mad Woman": "... I was thinking the most rage-provoking element of being a female is the gaslighting. There have been instances of this recently with someone who is very guilty of this in my life, and it's a person who tries to make me feel like I'm the offender by having any kind of defense. I feel like I have no right to respond, or I'm crazy, or I'm angry. How do I say why this feels so bad?"

Composition and lyrics

"Mad Woman" incorporates a prominent piano, which NME Hannah Mylrea found reminiscent of the National's 2019 album I Am Easy to Find. Lyrically, critics interpreted the song as Swift's critique of sexism, dealing with the social taboo regarding female anger. She addresses gender double standards through lines such as, "You poke that bear til the claws come out / And you find something to wrap your noose around." The lyric "And women like hunting witches too" evokes imagery of a witch hunt, such as those described in Swift's 2017 track "I Did Something Bad". Publications interpreted this part as Swift's response to the reactions from other women against her following the masters controversy.

Entertainment Weekly commented that the song reflected the social perception of female anger: "if a woman is emotional or angry, she gets labeled as 'crazy' ", especially through the lyrics "And there's nothing like a mad woman / What a shame she went mad / No one likes a mad woman / You made her like that." The magazine also compared the message of "Mad Woman" to that of "The Man", Swift's previous single from her 2019 album Lover: "Both songs tackle the ways in which women are defined, but where 'The Man' is broad in its complaints, 'Mad Woman' is more specific. Where 'The Man' is cheeky, 'Mad Woman' is dark, cynical, and angry."

Critical reception
The song was met with critical acclaim from music critics. In the Dallas Observer, Alexandra Lang complimented Swift for singing about social issues in "Mad Woman", writing: "The contrast of the softer melody with the biting lyrics illustrates the fine line that women are expected to tread with their emotions. Swift may have grown up, but she’s showing her ability to use her music to criticize systemic social issues — not just an ex-boyfriend." Slant Magazine Eric Mason felt that "Mad Woman", while a good song message-wise, lacks the sophistication that other Folklore songs display. Some media publications drew parallels between the song's narrative to that of Daenerys Targaryen's character arc in Game of Thrones, in which Targaryen is a powerful female character who goes "crazy" for the throne and has another female character as her greatest enemy.

Rob Sheffield of Rolling Stone said that "Mad Woman" sharpens the feminist rage of "The Man" (2019). The Sydney Morning Herald critic Giselle Au-Nhien Nguyen opined that "Mad Woman" depicts the "feeling of expectations falling away" with Swift dropping the first-ever F-bomb "in her decade-plus career", which she interpreted as, despite the soft texture of Folklore, Swift is "developing her own steel". Maura Johnston of Entertainment Weekly termed the song is an "extra hell-borne dread" with Swift's swirling vocals and an anchoring piano. According to The Independent critic Roisin O'Connor, "Mad Woman" continues Swift's "vengeful streak", but unlike "Look What You Made Me Do" (2017), her anger "now doesn't sound so brittle", comparing the character to a witch from William Shakespeare's Macbeth. New Statesman critic Anna Leszkiewicz defined "Mad Woman" as an "a melancholic ballad juxtaposed with lyrics that brim with ire", acknowledging the "sublimated rage of women who swallow their anger to avoid appearing 'mad' in both senses."

Credits and personnel
Credits are adapted from the album's liner notes.

 Taylor Swift – vocals, songwriting
 Aaron Dessner – songwriting, production, recording, drum programming, percussion, bass, acoustic guitar, electric guitar, piano, synthesizer
 Bryce Dessner – orchestration
 Serban Ghenea – mixing
 John Hanes – engineering
 Clarice Jensen – cello, cello recording
 Jonatham Low – recording
 James McAlister – beat programming, synthesizers, hand percussion, drums, recording
 Randy Merrill – mastering
 Yuki Numata Resnick – viola, violin
 Kyle Resnick – viola recording, violin recording

Charts

Weekly charts

Year-end chart

References

2020 songs
Taylor Swift songs
Songs written by Taylor Swift
Songs written by Aaron Dessner
Song recordings produced by Aaron Dessner
Songs with feminist themes